TheVentures (더벤처스) is a venture fund based in Seoul, South Korea that makes seed investments (between  $50,000 and $300,000) in startups.

History 
The firm was created in January 2014 by Vingle and Vicki co-founders Changseong Ho and Jiwon Moon.

In 2014 and 2015, the company was ranked by a government-funded survey as the most desired source of funding in Korea by Angel stage entrepreneurs

References 

Companies of South Korea
2014 establishments in South Korea
Companies based in Seoul
Financial services companies established in 2014